List by Family Name: A - B - C - D - E - F - G - H - I - J - K - M - N - O - R - S - T - U - W - Y - Z

 Nada Inanda (born 1929)
 Nagai Kafu (December 4, 1879 – April 30, 1959)
 Nagai Tatsuo (May 20, 1904 – October 12, 1990)
 Nagai Michiko (born 1921)
 Nagata Hideo (1885–1949)
 Nagata Mikihiko (1887–1964)
 Nagayo Yoshiro (August 6, 1888 – October 29, 1961)
 Nagatsuka Takashi (April 3, 1879 – February 8, 1915)
 Naito Torajiro (July 18, 1866 – June 26, 1934)
 Naka Kansuke (May 22, 1885 – May 3, 1965)
 Nakagami Kenji (August 2, 1946 – August 12, 1992)
 Nakahara Chuya (April 29, 1907 – October 22, 1937)
 Nakajima Atsushi (May 5, 1909 – December 4, 1942)
 Nakajima Ramo (April 3, 1952 – July 26, 2004)
 Nakamori Akio (born 1960)
 Nakamura Shinichiro (March 5, 1918 – December 25, 1997)
 Nakamura Mitsuo (February 5, 1911 – July 12, 1988)
 Nakane Chie (born 1926)
 Nakano Koji (1925–2004)
 Nakayama Gishu (October 5, 1900 – August 19, 1969)
 Nakazato Tsuneko (1884–1945)
 Naito Joso (1662–1704)
 Naoki Sanjugo (February 12, 1891 – February 24, 1934)
 Narushima Ryūhoku (1837–1934)
 Natsume Sōseki (February 9, 1867 – December 9, 1916)
 Nasu Kinoko (born 1973)
 Nicol, Clive (born 1940)
 Niimi Nankichi (July 30, 1913 – March 22, 1943)
 Niki Etsuko (1928–1986)
 Nishimura Kyotaro (born 1930)
 Nishiyama Sōin (1605–1682)
 Nishio Ishin (born 1981)
 Nishiwaki Junzaburo (January 20, 1894 – June 5, 1982)
 Niwa Fumio (November 22, 1904 – April 20, 2005)
 Nitobe Inazo (September 1, 1862 – October 15, 1933)
 Nitta Jirō (1912–1980)
 Nobumoto Keiko (born 1964)
 Nishida Kitaro (1870–1945)
 Nobori Shomu (1878–1958)
 Noda Hideki (playwright) (born 1955)
 Nogami Yaeko (1885–1985)
 Noguchi Fujio (1911–1993)
 Nogushi Yonejiro December 8, 1875 – July 13, 1947)
 Noma Hiroshi (February 23, 1915 – January 2, 1991)
 Nomi Masahiko (July 18, 1925 – October 30, 1981)
 Nomura Kodo (1882–1963)
 Nosaka Akiyuki (born October 10, 1930)
 Nukata no Ōkimi (630–690)

N